Chishaku-in (智積院) is a Buddhist temple in Higashiyama-ku, Kyoto, Japan. It is affiliated with Shingon-shū Chizan-ha Buddhism. It was established in 1601.

The temple has a historic garden that was said to be a favourite of Sen no Rikyū.

The Nihonga artist Inshō Dōmoto received a commission from the monastery to paint new sliding doors facing the famous garden. "Ladies at Tea" from 1958 shows a more western-style painting of two women enjoying tea. The left side is a woman in kimono, while the lady to the right is in western dress. The four sliding doors were a departure from the traditional style.

See also 
Thirteen Buddhist Sites of Kyoto

References

External links 
 

Buddhist temples in Kyoto